The Cimetière du Grand Jas (Grand Jas Cemetery) is located at 205 avenue de Grasse in Cannes on the French Riviera. The nine hectare terraced cemetery began operations in 1866 and is known for its landscaped architecture with rich floral decorations and statuary.

Its "English square", or Cimetière Anglais, is the final resting place for a number of English people who made Cannes their home. It is dominated by the statue of Henry Peter Brougham, 1st Baron Brougham and Vaux who played a major role in building the city.  The cemetery contains one Commonwealth war grave, of a World War I officer of the King's Royal Rifle Corps.

Notable interments
 Augustus Anson (1835–1877), Victoria Cross recipient and former British member of parliament
 Henry Peter Brougham (1778–1868), British lawyer, statesman, builder of Cannes
 Eugène Brieux (1858–1932), dramatist
 Jorge Cuevas Bartholín (1885–1961), American ballet school founder, husband of Margaret Rockefeller Strong de Larraín, Marquesa de Cuevas
 John Francis Campbell (1821–1885), Scottish author and scholar
 Martine Carol (1922–1967), actress
 Jean Gabriel Domergue (1889–1962), painter, poster artist
 Henry Eeles Dresser (1838–1915), ornithologist and author
 Ernest Duchesne (1874–1912), medical scientist
 Peter Carl Fabergé (1846–1920), Russian jewellery designer
 Nancy Fish (1850–1927), English socialite, second wife of P. T. Barnum
 Georges Guétary (1915–1997), singer, actor
 Olga Khoklova (1891–1955), Russian ballerina (Picasso's first wife)
 Apo Lazaridès (1925–1998), champion cyclist
 Klaus Mann (1906–1949), German writer. Son of writer Thomas Mann.

 Prosper Mérimée (1803–1870), writer
 Jacques Monod (1910–1976), biochemist, Nobel Prize winner
 Marquis de Morès (1858–1896), adventurer
 Arthur Frederick Pickard (1844–1880), Victoria Cross recipient.
 Lily Pons (1898–1976), opera singer
 Emmanuel Signoret (1872–1900), poet
 John Fitzwilliam Stairs (1848–1904), Canadian entrepreneur and statesman
 Marcel Thil (1904–1968), world boxing champion
 Paul von Thurn und Taxis, aka Paul de Fels (1843–1879), Impresario and former Aide-de-Camp of Ludwig II of Bavaria
 Laurent Vianay (1843–1928), architect
 William Bonaparte Wyse (1826–1892), Irish poet, entomologist

References

Burials at the Cimetière du Grand Jas
Cemeteries in France
Buildings and structures in Cannes
1866 establishments in France